Donn James Everett (April 29, 1929–November 29, 2007) was an American politician who served as a Republican in the Kansas State Senate and Kansas House of Representatives from 1969 to 1978.

Everett was born in Emporia, Kansas. He served in the U.S. Marine Corps during the Korean War; after returning to Kansas, he married Frederica Voiland in 1956 and worked as an attorney. The couple had six children before divorcing acrimoniously; the youngest child, Bridget Everett, became a noted comedian and cabaret performer.

Everett's first forays into elected office were winning races for county attorney of Riley County and serving as a member of the city council in Manhattan, Kansas (including a stint as mayor). In 1968, he was elected to the Kansas House, serving until 1975. While in the Kansas House, he rose to the post of Majority Leader.

During his fourth term, in 1975, he was appointed to the Kansas Senate to fill the seat left vacant by Richard Dean Rogers, who resigned to serve as a federal judge. He served in the Senate until his own resignation in 1978.

References

Republican Party Kansas state senators
Republican Party members of the Kansas House of Representatives
Kansas Republicans
20th-century American politicians
People from Manhattan, Kansas
United States Marine Corps personnel of the Korean War
Kansas lawyers
University of Kansas alumni
University of Kansas School of Law alumni
District attorneys in Kansas
Mayors of places in Kansas
Kansas city council members
1929 births
2007 deaths